In mathematics, specifically in the calculus of variations, a variation  of a function  can be concentrated on an arbitrarily small interval, but not a single point.
Accordingly, the necessary condition of extremum (functional derivative equal zero) appears in a weak formulation (variational form) integrated with an arbitrary function . The fundamental lemma of the calculus of variations is typically used to transform this weak formulation into the strong formulation (differential equation), free of the integration with arbitrary function. The proof usually exploits the possibility to choose  concentrated on an interval on which  keeps sign (positive or negative). Several versions of the lemma are in use. Basic versions are easy to formulate and prove. More powerful versions are used when needed.

Basic version

If a continuous function  on an open interval  satisfies the equality

Here "smooth" may be interpreted as "infinitely differentiable", but often is interpreted as "twice continuously differentiable" or "continuously differentiable" or even just "continuous", since these weaker statements may be strong enough for a given task.

Version for two given functions

If a pair of continuous functions f, g on an interval (a,b) satisfies the equality

for all compactly supported smooth functions h on (a,b), then g is differentiable, and g''' = f  everywhere.

The special case for g = 0 is just the basic version.

Here is the special case for f = 0 (often sufficient).

If a continuous function g on an interval (a,b) satisfies the equality

for all smooth functions h on (a,b) such that , then g is constant.

If, in addition, continuous differentiability of g is assumed, then integration by parts reduces both statements to the basic version; this case is attributed to Joseph-Louis Lagrange, while the proof of differentiability of g is due to Paul du Bois-Reymond.

Versions for discontinuous functions

The given functions (f, g) may be discontinuous, provided that they are locally integrable (on the given interval). In this case, Lebesgue integration is meant, the conclusions hold almost everywhere (thus, in all continuity points), and differentiability of g is interpreted as local absolute continuity (rather than continuous differentiability). Sometimes the given functions are assumed to be piecewise continuous, in which case Riemann integration suffices, and the conclusions are stated everywhere except the finite set of discontinuity points.

Higher derivatives

If a tuple of continuous functions  on an interval (a,b) satisfies the equality

for all compactly supported smooth functions h on (a,b), then there exist continuously differentiable functions  on (a,b) such that

everywhere.

This necessary condition is also sufficient, since the integrand becomes 

The case n = 1 is just the version for two given functions, since  and  thus, 

In contrast, the case n=2 does not lead to the relation  since the function  need not be differentiable twice. The sufficient condition  is not necessary.

Vector-valued functions

Generalization to vector-valued functions  is straightforward; one applies the results for scalar functions to each coordinate separately, or treats the vector-valued case from the beginning.

Multivariable functions

If a continuous multivariable function f on an open set  satisfies the equality

for all compactly supported smooth functions h on Ω, then f is identically zero.

Similarly to the basic version, one may consider a continuous function f on the closure of Ω, assuming that h vanishes on the boundary of Ω (rather than compactly supported).

Here is a version for discontinuous multivariable functions.

Let  be an open set, and  satisfy the equality

for all compactly supported smooth functions h on Ω. Then f=0 (in L''2, that is, almost everywhere).

Applications
This lemma is used to prove that extrema of the functional

are  weak solutions  (for an appropriate vector space ) of the Euler–Lagrange equation

The Euler–Lagrange equation plays a prominent role in classical mechanics and differential geometry.

Notes

References

 (transl. from Russian).

Classical mechanics
Calculus of variations
Smooth functions
Lemmas in analysis